TV9 Gujarati is an Indian free to air 24-hour regional news channel broadcasting in Gujarati language. It operates from Ahmedabad, Gujarat. It is owned by Associated Broadcasting Company Private Limited , which also operates news channels like TV9 Bharatvarsh, TV9 Telugu, TV9 Kannada, TV9 Marathi and TV9 Bangla.

 

24-hour television news channels in India
Television
Television channels and stations established in 2008
TV9 Group
Television stations in Ahmedabad
Gujarati-language television channels in India